The Tinkling Spring Presbyterian Church, is a Presbyterian church founded in 1740, and is the oldest Presbyterian congregation in the Valley of Virginia (the Shenandoah Valley).  Its historic building is listed on the National Register of Historic Places (NRHP).

The church's first building was a log structure built during 1742–1748. Much of the cost of the original meeting house was underwritten by Colonel James Patton. It took nearly three years to finish, with some controversy between Patton and his uncle John Lewis over where it was to be located. The first service was held there on 14 April 1745, when the Reverend John Craig wrote: "This being the first day we meet at the contentious meeting-house, about half-built." The log structure was replaced by a stone building in 1790.  Its 1850 Greek Revival building is its third building, and is significant architecturally for being designed by Robert Lewis Dabney who served as pastor there from 1852–1857.  This Greek Revival building, along with two other churches designed by Dabney, is credited with influencing ecclesiastical architecture in Virginia.  Dabney designed at least two other NRHP-listed churches, Briery Church, in Briery, Virginia, and New Providence Presbyterian Church, near Brownsburg, Virginia.

The building was listed on the National Register of Historic Places in 1973.

References

External links

Tinkling Springs Church, State Route 608, Fishersville, Augusta County, VA: 5 measured drawings at Historic American Buildings Survey

Churches on the National Register of Historic Places in Virginia
Greek Revival church buildings in Virginia
Churches completed in 1850
Buildings and structures in Augusta County, Virginia
Historic American Buildings Survey in Virginia
National Register of Historic Places in Augusta County, Virginia
1850 establishments in Virginia